Durral B. Evans was the first head football coach at Kentucky State University in Frankfort, Kentucky and he held that position for three seasons, from 1921 until 1923.  His career coaching record at Kentucky State was 5–7.

References

Year of birth missing
Year of death missing
Kentucky State Thorobreds football coaches